= Yaraguddi =

- Village
- Nickname: kaddi
- Country: India
- State: Karnataka
- District: Belgaum
- Founder: Shivalingappa Goudappa Patil
- Named for: teady beer,

Languages
  - Official: Kannada
- Time zone: UTC+5:30 (IST)
- Postal code: 591102

Yaraguddi is a village in Belgaum district in the southern state of Karnataka, India.
